Turok is a series of first-person shooter video games based on the comic book character of the same name. It is set in a primitive world inhabited by dinosaurs and other creatures. The series was originally developed by Acclaim Studios Austin as Iguana Entertainment and published by Acclaim Entertainment from 1995 until Acclaim's bankruptcy in September 2004. The series was then developed by Propaganda Games and published by Touchstone Games. The series generated more than $250 million in revenue by 2002.

Games

Turok: Dinosaur Hunter 

The first game in the series. Developed by Iguana Entertainment and published by Acclaim for the Nintendo 64 console and personal computer platforms in 1997. A remastered version developed by Nightdive Studios was released for Windows (through Steam) and Xbox One in 2017 and 2018 respectively. The remastered version was also released on the Nintendo Switch on March 18, 2019 and on PlayStation 4 on February 25, 2021.

Turok 2: Seeds of Evil 

The sequel to Dinosaur Hunter, released for the Nintendo 64 in late 1998 and ported to Windows OS in 1999. A separate game, also titled Turok 2: Seeds of Evil, was released for the Game Boy Color in 1998. Although set in the same fictional universe, the Game Boy Color game follows a different storyline. Just like the first game, a remastered version developed by Nightdive Studios was released for Windows (through Steam) and Xbox One in 2017 and 2018, respectively. The remastered version also came out on the Nintendo Switch in 2019.

Turok: Rage Wars 

A non-canon game that was released for the Nintendo 64 in 1999. A Game Boy Color version followed in 2000 but shared nothing in common with its home console counterpart.

Turok 3: Shadow of Oblivion 

The sequel to Seeds of Evil, released in 2000 for the Nintendo 64. A Game Boy Color version was released but shared nothing in common with its console counterpart.

Turok: Evolution 

The prequel to Dinosaur Hunter, released for the PlayStation 2, Xbox and GameCube in 2002. A 2D side-scrolling version was also released for the Game Boy Advance. A port for Microsoft Windows was released in 2003 for the European market.

Turok 

A reboot that is unrelated to the previous games. Developed by Propaganda Games, published by Touchstone Games and distributed by Disney Interactive Studios. Released in 2008 for the Xbox 360 and PlayStation 3. It was later ported to Microsoft Windows that same year.

Cancelled games

Untitled Turok Game Boy Advance game 
A prototype game for the Game Boy Advance system, planned for release sometime before Turok: Evolution.

Untitled Turok: Evolution sequel 
After the release of Turok: Evolution, Acclaim Studios Austin placed a small team in charge of creating a sequel. The project was not picked up, and the team moved on to other projects.

Turok 2 
Turok 2, known chronologically as Turok 6 in various news articles, was a planned and partially developed sequel to Turok from 2008. It was eventually cancelled mid-development, due to many layoffs at Propaganda Games.

References

External links 
 

DreamWorks Classics franchises
Video games based on Turok
Video game franchises
Video game franchises introduced in 1997